Javier Calvo may refer to:

 Javier Calvo (writer) (born 1973), Spanish writer
 Javier Calvo (actor) (born 1991), Spanish actor